Richard Gordon Price (10 June 1944 – 17 May 2022) was an English bassist who played with various Birmingham-based rock bands, most notably Sight and Sound, the Move (1969–1971), and Wizzard (1972–1975).

Life and career
Price was born and raised in Birmingham, Warwickshire, on 10 June 1944. His first band were the Cimarrons, who were inspired by the Shadows. He then moved on to the Sombreros, who later changed their name to Sight & Sound and moved in a more psychedelic direction. He began collaborating with Mike Sheridan as a songwriting partnership. Price joined the Move in 1969, staying with the group for two years, including an unsuccessful tour of the United States. He also contributed bass tracks to the early sessions for the debut album of ELO, but for reasons that are unclear, none of his bass parts ended up in the final mix of the album when it was released in 1971.

After leaving the Move he signed a contract with Gemini Records; he then recorded (with Sheridan) the album This Is To Certify That, released in 1970, and a solo album, Talking To The Flowers, in 1971. He then joined former Move colleague Carl Wayne in Light Fantastic, before forming Mongrel with future Wizzard drummers Charlie Grima and Keith Smart.

He joined up again with Roy Wood in the latter's new band, Wizzard, with whom he had two British number one hit singles, "See My Baby Jive" and "Angel Fingers", as well as the No. 4 Christmas classic "I Wish It Could Be Christmas Everyday" (all 1973). 

After Wizzard split up, he joined the Wizzo Band on pedal steel guitar in 1975, but they broke up in 1978. Price was also a member of The Rockin' Berries from 1990 until his death.

Price worked with the 1970s duo Peters and Lee beginning in 1976, eventually marrying Lee and working with her as a performing duo.

Price died on 17 May 2022, at the age of 77.

References

External links
 

1944 births
2022 deaths
English rock bass guitarists
Male bass guitarists
The Move members
Musicians from Birmingham, West Midlands
Electric Light Orchestra members
Pedal steel guitarists
English male singers
English songwriters
Wizzard members